Hyposmocoma insinuatrix is a species of moth of the family Cosmopterigidae. It was first described by Edward Meyrick in 1928. It is endemic to the Hawaiian island of Molokai.

The larvae feed on Smilax sandwicensis. They bore in dead wood. They do not make a case.

External links

insinuatrix
Endemic moths of Hawaii
Biota of Molokai
Moths described in 1928